Wilco is a farmer-owned farm supply cooperative that began as the Santiam Farmers Co-op in the 1930s based in the Willamette Valley of the U.S. state of Oregon. In 1967, the Santiam Farmers Co-op merged with 4 other co-ops, the Mt. Angel Farmers Union Warehouse, the Donald Farmers Co-op, the Valley Farmers Co-op in Silverton, and the Canby Cooperative to form "Wilco Farmers Coop". The name "Wilco" comes from a shortening of "Willamette Consolidated".

The cooperative has four divisions — Hazelnut Growers of Oregon, an ag business division that provides customers with crop protection products and fertilizers (Valley Agronomics), a fuels division for commercial petroleum, lubricants, and residential propane delivery and the farm store division.

Today, the farmer-owned cooperative operates 24 retail farm stores throughout Oregon, Washington and California. The retailer carries a wide range of hardware supplies alongside land, lawn, garden, livestock, and pet-related products and services.

The farmer-owned cooperative's headquarters are in Mt. Angel. Hazelnut Growers of Oregon processing plant and headquarters are based in Donald.

In 2011, Wilco launched a program to support local FFA, called FFA Forever, collecting donations from vendors, employees, and customers. As of 2019, the program had collected more than 1 million dollars to benefit the Oregon and Washington FFA Associations.

References

External links
Wilco Coop - Official site
Wilco Farm Store - Official site
Hazelnut Growers of Oregon - Official site
Valley Agronomics - Official site

Agricultural supply cooperatives
Companies based in Marion County, Oregon
Agriculture in Oregon
Mt. Angel, Oregon
American companies established in 1967
Retail companies established in 1967
1967 establishments in Oregon
Agriculture companies of the United States